is a multi-purpose stadium in Okinawa, Okinawa Prefecture, Japan. It is currently used mostly for football matches. It serves as a home ground of J.League club, FC Ryukyu and Japan Football League club, Okinawa SV. The stadium holds 25,000 people.

It was formerly known as Okinawa Athletic Park Stadium. Since June 2018, it has been called Tapic Kenso Hiyagon Stadium for the naming rights.

Gallery

References

External links
Venue information

1987 establishments in Japan
Football venues in Japan
Athletics (track and field) venues in Japan
Multi-purpose stadiums in Japan
Sports venues in Okinawa Prefecture
FC Ryukyu
Sports venues completed in 1987
Okinawa, Okinawa